The New South Wales Minister for Lands and Water, previously the Minister for Water, Property and Housing  is a minister in the New South Wales Government with responsibility for the administration and development for water and crown lands in New South Wales, Australia.

The current minister is Kevin Anderson, since 21 December 2021. The minister administers the portfolio through the Planning and Environment cluster, including the Department of Planning and Environment and a range of other government agencies.

Ultimately the minister is responsible to the Parliament of New South Wales.

List of ministers
The following individuals have served as the Minister for Lands and Water or any precedent titles:

Former ministerial titles

Water

Lands

See also 

List of New South Wales government agencies
Minister for Agriculture (New South Wales)
Minister for Environment and Heritage

References

Water, Property and Housing